Yeah! is the ninth studio album by British rock band Def Leppard. It is the first cover album by the band. It was originally to be released on 20 September 2005, but it was announced on 31 March 2006 that the album would be released on 23 May 2006. The album charted at No. 16 on the Billboard 200 and No. 52 on the UK Albums Chart.

Artwork
The accompanying booklet contains photographs of the band members recreating classic images from '70s album art.
 Rick Savage – Freddie Mercury from the album Queen II
 Vivian Campbell – Marc Bolan from T. Rex's Electric Warrior
 Joe Elliott – David Bowie from the rear cover of The Rise and Fall of Ziggy Stardust and the Spiders from Mars
 Rick Allen – Lou Reed, Transformer
 Phil Collen – The Stooges, Raw Power
There are also four group photographs in the CD booklet – on the cover, the centre, inside back cover and the back cover.
The inside back cover (back of the CD holder) has a picture with the original triangle Def Leppard logo (from the On Through the Night album), with a shaft of light passing through it and creating a rainbow, a la the cover of Pink Floyd's The Dark Side of the Moon.

Reception
Rating the album 4.5 out of 5, Stephen Thomas Erlewine of AllMusic praised Yeah! as the band's best effort since Hysteria, noting how the band "no longer sound as slick and calculated as they did on their albums after Hysteria; they sound alive and vigorous, making a convincing case that they're now their own best producers." Erlewine concluded that "few bands could achieve an artistic comeback via a covers album, but as this glorious record proves, there are few bands like Def Leppard."

Track listing

Bonus material

Personnel
Joe Elliott – lead vocals, piano, all instruments "Space Oddity", art direction on inner sleeve
Phil Collen – guitar, backing vocals, lead vocals on "Stay with Me" and "Search and Destroy", all instruments on "Search and Destroy"
Vivian Campbell – guitar, backing vocals
Rick Savage – bass, backing vocals, lead vocals and all instruments on "Dear Friends"
Rick Allen – drums, percussion

Additional personnel
Emm Gryner—backing vocals, piano on "The Golden Age Of Rock 'N' Roll"
Ian Hunter—spoken intro on "The Golden Age of Rock 'N' Roll"
Justin Hawkins – backing vocals on "Hell Raiser"
Marc Danzeisen – drums and harmony/backing vocals on "American Girl"
t42design – artwork
Vartan – art direction on cover
Clay Patrick McBride – photography on cover art, back cover, trays
Mick Rock – photography on inner sleeve

Charts

Weekly charts

Singles

References

Def Leppard albums
2006 albums
Covers albums
Island Records albums
Mercury Records albums
Albums with cover art by Mick Rock